Abouzar Safarzadeh (born April 13, 1996 in Shiraz, Iran) is an Iranian football midfielder who currently plays for Shahr Khodro in the Persian Gulf Pro League.

Club career

Club career statistics

References

1995 births
Living people
Iranian footballers
Association football midfielders
Fajr Sepasi players
Zob Ahan Esfahan F.C. players
Shahin Bushehr F.C. players
Sanat Mes Kerman F.C. players
People from Shiraz
Sportspeople from Fars province